Holdcroft is a surname. Notable people with the surname include:

Anita Holdcroft, British emeritus professor of Anaesthetics
George Holdcroft (1909–1983), British footballer
James Holdcroft (1874–1926), British footballer
Ted Holdcroft (c. 1882–1952), British footballer